Carmenta apache is a moth of the family Sesiidae. It was described by George Paul Engelhardt in 1946. It is known only from Arizona in the United States.

References

External links
mothphotographersgroup

Sesiidae
Moths described in 1946